Rufinus (floruit 431–432) was a praetorian prefect of the East, one of the most important officials of the Eastern Roman Empire.

Life 

Rufinus was a relative of Emperor Theodosius II (r. 402–450). He is attested in office between March 431 and March 432 by two letters of Isidore of Pelusium. One of these letters (letter 178) contained a reproach towards the prefect for ignoring the wrongdoings of the governor of Cyrenius. This Rufinus might be the successor of Antiochus Chuzon in this office.

Sources 
 Jones, Arnold Hugh Martin, John Robert Martindale, John Morris, "Rufinus 8", Prosopography of the Later Roman Empire, Volume 2, Cambridge University Press, 1980, p. 953.

References 

5th-century Byzantine people
Praetorian prefects of the East
Theodosian dynasty